Sir Thomas Michael Sydney  Hughes-Hallett  (born 28 August 1954) is a British barrister, investment banker and philanthropy executive. He serves as the Non-Executive Chair of the Marshall Institute at the London School of Economics and the Chelsea and Westminster Hospital NHS Foundation Trust. He promotes philanthropy, and argues for more ethical engagement within the City of London.

Early life
Thomas Michael Sydney Hughes-Hallett was born on 28 August 1954.

He was educated at Eton College, a private boarding school in Berkshire, England. He then went on to read History at the University of Oxford. In an interview, he stated to have taught mathematics, music and hockey in Zimbabwe at the age of twenty-one. He then received a law degree from The College of Law.

Career
Sir Thomas first trained as a barrister, but quit soon thereafter as he felt the job was "lonely". In another interview, he stated that his image of being a barrister was shattered when his first case was an eleven-week incest trial. After facing a retrial that would take another eleven weeks, Sir Thomas is quoted as saying that "I just couldn't face going through that again so I left." He subsequently worked as an investment banker for Schroders for five years.

In the late 1980s, he founded an investment bank, Enskilda Securities, earning him the nickname "Thomas Huge-Wallet". For the next eighteen years, he was the Chief Executive of Enskilda Corporate and later the Chairman of Robert Fleming Securities. A major shareholder in Flemings, he retired from finance shortly after its merger with Chase in 2000.

Philanthropy 
Sir Thomas became first involved in charities during the 1990s, during which he was first a trustee and later the Chairman of the Michael Palin Centre for Stammering Children, as well as Chairman of the English Churches Housing Group.

In 1999, Sir Thomas suffered an apparent heart attack, which he hinted was the result of a stressful life style in his capacity as an investment executive. This health scare caused him to re-evaluate his priorities in life.

In 2000, he left investment banking to do charity work instead. From 2000 to 2012, he served as the Chairman of the Marie Curie Cancer Care Trust. To raise his salary of £90,000, in 2002 he cycled across Vietnam for the Marie Curie Cancer Care to be able to keep him. According to a report, he seeks to cover his salary cost through similar fund-raising challenges every year.

Sir Thomas serves or has served in leading positions of various charitable organisations. He served as the Executive Chair of the Institute of Global Health Innovation at Imperial College London. Additionally, he served as the Chairman of the End of Life Care Implementation Advisory Board and as Chair of the Palliative Care Funding Review. Furthermore, he is a member of the board of trustees of the Esmée Fairbairn Foundation. He is the Chairman of the Chelsea and Westminster Hospital NHS Foundation Trust. He also serves on the board of trustees of the King's Fund.

In 2013, he became Chairman of Cause4, an organisation that assists charities in their fundraising.

Views on Banking and Charity 
Hughes-Hallett has called for more bankers and investors from the City of London to be involved in philanthropy and donate not only time and talent, but also money. In a 2002 interview, Hughes-Hallet expressed his surprise when he realised that the people who can afford to donate money usually don't.

Speaking at the Close Brothers Trustee Leadership Programme, a seminar organised by Close Brothers Asset Management, an investment firm based in the City of London, in 2014, he argued that serving on the Board of Trustees of a philanthropic organisation was a valuable work experience to then serve on a corporate board.

In the past, he has expressed the sentiment that his own generation of bankers was far too concerned about making money, but that he believes the younger generation has realised the importance of philanthropy. He also expressed hopes that the younger generation of bankers in the City is more generous that his own.

Sir Thomas has expressed doubts regarding the utility of "social investments", considered sometimes as a sustainable alternative to philanthropy. Specifically, he criticised how social investments are portrayed as a charitable activity, but can often lead to unethical practices, especially in the health sector.

Call for NHS reform 
In 2013, he called for a reform of the National Health Service, arguing that people's expectation of the NHS to provide all health services for free is setting it up for a breakdown. He called for making greater use of British society in health care.

Marshall Institute 
In 2015, Hughes-Hallet together with investment banker Sir Paul Marshall established the Marshall Institute for Philanthropy and Social Entrepreneurship at the London School of Economics, supported by a £30 million investment by Paul Marshall. The Institute's student body is expected to consist of people who have "reached the age of 50, a partner in an international firm, who've decided they've made their money and want to put something back."

Accolades 
He was knighted by the Queen for services to palliative care during her 2012 Birthday Honours. As a result, he is styled Sir Thomas Hughes-Hallett.

In 2013, he was the recipient of the Beacon Fellowship from the UK Community Foundations.

Anglia Ruskin University awarded Hughes-Hallett with an Honorary Doctor of Arts in 2015.

Personal life
He is married to Jules, Lady Hughes-Hallett, whom he met immediately after leaving Oxford and who is a former fashion editor of Vogue. 

She is the Chair of Smart Works, a non-profit organisation which gives free clothes and job interview advice to women who are unemployed. The couple have three children, two of whom are sons. They lost an infant daughter, Emily.

References

Living people
1954 births
Lawyers from London
People educated at Eton College
Alumni of the University of Oxford
British investment bankers
Deputy Lieutenants of Suffolk
Knights Bachelor
People associated with Imperial College London
Philanthropists from London
Schroders people
English barristers